Lanark is an unincorporated community and former village in the municipality (and incorporated township) of Lanark Highlands, Lanark County, in Eastern Ontario, Canada.

History

The village was first settled in 1820 by Scottish immigrants who named it after the town of Lanark in Scotland.  In 1823 it established its first post office.  It soon became a major hub of the lumbering and textile industries, both of which used the Clyde River which runs through the village, as a source of power and as a transportation route to transport logs east to the Ottawa River.

The textile industry lasted for about 170 years, but was finally defeated by the flood of cheap Asian textiles into North America. Jobs in the textile industry moved overseas.

Logging has continued, although in a much reduced manner. Wood is harvested chiefly for the pulp industry or for firewood. In 1959 a major fire destroyed many of the main commercial structures and a number of homes in the village's centre. Most buildings were inadequately insured. Replacement buildings are highly functional in their design. The village has the Lanark and District Museum featuring exhibits of local history.

Until the late 1990s, the major employer in the village was the Glenayr Kitten Mill, which produced clothing and offered their products at several factory outlet stores in the village. Several of the buildings are still known by their numbers (e.g. Kitten Factory #1) to local residents.  The Clyde Woolen Mills was the founder of these properties.

Sport and recreation
Lanark has in the past been the location for the Canadian Big League Baseball Championships. This highly regarded baseball tournament features 18-year-old players from across the country to play at Clyde Memorial Park.

Demographics 

According to the 2001 Statistics Canada Census:
Population: 869
% Change (1996-2001): 0.5
Dwellings: 362
Area (km2.): 4.73
Density (persons per km2.): 183.7

Race Break Up
White: 98.5%
Aboriginal: 1.1%
Asian: .2%
Black: .2%

References

Former villages in Ontario
Communities in Lanark County
Designated places in Ontario